Helgemo is a Norwegian surname. Notable people with the surname include:

Celine Helgemo (born 1995), Norwegian singer and songwriter
Geir Helgemo (born 1970), Norwegian bridge player

Norwegian-language surnames